Amaretto is an almond-flavored Italian liqueur.

Amaretto may also refer to:

Almond-flavored cookies (plural amaretti):
Almond macaron (with almond paste or meal)
Amaretti di Saronno in Lombardy, Italy
Almond meringue (with egg whites)
Almond biscuits (twice baked, with whole eggs):
Biscotti, widely known, especially in Italy, Spain, and North America
 "Amaretto" as a flavouring, derived from several sources:
 Benzaldehyde
 Amygdalin
 Orgeat syrup

See also
Amaro (liqueur)
Frangipane, almond filling